Maldivian, also known by its endonym Dhivehi or Divehi, is an Indo-Aryan language spoken in the South Asian island country of Maldives and on Minicoy Island, Lakshadweep, a union territory of India.

The Maldivian language has notable dialects. The standard dialect is that of the capital city, Malé. The greatest dialectal variation is from the southern atolls Huvadu, Addu and Fuvahmulah of Maldives. Each of those atolls has its own dialect closely related to each other but very different from the northern atolls. The southern atoll dialects are so distinct that those only speaking northern dialects cannot understand them.

The ethnic endonym for the language, Divehi, is occasionally found in English as Dhivehi (spelled according to the locally used Malé Latin for romanisation of the Maldivian language), which is the official spelling as well as the common usage in the Maldives. Dhivehi is written in Thaana script.

Dhivehi is a descendant of Elu Prakrit and is closely related to Sinhalese, but not mutually intelligible with it. Many languages have influenced the development of Dhivehi through the ages. They include Arabic, Urdu/Hindustani, Persian, Tamil, French, Portuguese, and English. Before European colonization of the Southern Hemisphere, it was the southernmost Indo-European language.

Etymology
The origin of the word "Divehi" is from older divu+vesi, meaning "island dwelling". Vesi came from Sanskrit vāsin and later became vehi. Divu  (from Sanskrit dvīpa) later became the suffix -dū, which is currently present in many names of Maldivian islands, such as Hanimādū, Mīdū, and Dāndū.  (from Sanskrit bhāṣā) means "language", so  means "islanders' language". 

Wilhelm Geiger, a German linguist who undertook the first research on Maldivian linguistics in the early 20th century, also called the language Divehi. An h was added to the name of the language— "Dhivehi"— in 1976, when the semi-official transliteration called Malé Latin was developed. Today the spelling with Dh has common and semi-official usage in the Maldives.

Origin
Maldivian is an Indo-Aryan language closely related to the Sinhalese language of Sri Lanka. Maldivian represents the southernmost Indo-Aryan language. Maldivian and Sinhalese together constitute a subgroup within the modern Indo-Aryan languages, called Insular Indo-Aryan. However, they are not mutually intelligible.

Maldivian and Sinhalese are descended from the Elu Prakrit of ancient and medieval Sri Lanka. These Prakrits were originally derived from Old Indo-Aryan vernaculars related to Vedic Sanskrit.

Whereas formerly Maldivian was thought to be a descendant of Sinhalese, in 1969 Sinhalese philologist M. W. S. de Silva for the first time proposed that Maldivian and Sinhalese had branched off from a common mother language.

History

Earlier inscriptions on coral stone have also been found. The oldest inscription found to date is an inscription on a coral stone, which is estimated to be from around the 6th-8th centuries.

Maldivian is an Indo-Aryan language of the Sinhalese-Maldivian subfamily. It developed in relative isolation from other languages until the 12th century. Since the 16th century, Maldivian has been written in a unique script called Thaana which is written from right to left, like those of Aramaic and Arabic (with which it shares several common diacritics for vowel sounds).

The foundation of the historical linguistic analysis of both Maldivian and Sinhalese was laid by Wilhelm Geiger (1856–1943). In Geiger's comparative study of Maldivian and Sinhalese, he assumes that Maldivian is a dialectal offspring of Sinhalese and therefore is a "daughter language" of Sinhalese. However, the material he collected was not sufficient to judge the "degree of relationship" of Maldivian and Sinhalese.

Geiger concludes that Maldivian must have split from Sinhalese not earlier than the 10th century CE. However, there is nothing in the history of these islands or Sinhalese chronicles, even in legendary form, that alludes to a migration of Sinhalese people which would result in such a connection. Maldives is completely absent from the pre-12th century records of Sri Lanka.

A rare Maliku Thaana primer written in the Maliku dialect, published by Lakshadweep's administration during the time of Rajiv Gandhi's rule, was reprinted by Spanish researcher Xavier Romero-Frias in 2003.

There is a holiday, the Dhivehi Language Day, which is celebrated in the Maldives on 14 April, the birthday of the writer Husain Salaahuddin.

Geographic distribution
Maldivian is spoken in the Maldives and a variation of it in Minicoy.

Official status
Maldivian is the official language of the Maldives and a semi-official language in the union territory of Lakshadweep, India.

Dialects
The Maldivian language has multiple dialects due to the wide distribution of the islands, causing differences in pronunciation and vocabulary to develop during the centuries. The most divergent dialects of the language are to be found in the southern atolls, namely Huvadhu, Fuvahmulah and Addu. The other variants show less difference to the official dialect, including the dialects spoken in a few islands in Kolhumadulu Atoll and the now obsolete dialect once spoken in Giraavaru, which are hardly recognised and known.

Malé dialect is the mainstream Maldivian dialect and is based on the dialect spoken in the capital of the Maldives, Malé.
Haddhunmathee dialect spoken in Haddhunmathi Atoll.
Maliku dialect (Mahl) spoken in Minicoy (Maliku) in union territory of Lakshadweep, India. The dialect spoken in Minicoy has fewer differences from the standard Maldivian than other dialects. It has some archaic forms of words and Malayalam loanwords.
Mulaku dialect is a dialect of Maldivian spoken by the people of Fuvahmulah. Mulaku dialect has word-final 'l', which is absent from the other dialects of Maldivian. Regarding pronunciation, the retroflex 'ṣ' (IPA [ʂ]), has a [ɽ̊~ɽ̊r̥] sound in the Mulaku dialect and was once pronounced that way in official Maldivian. One of the most unusual features of Mulaku dialect is that, unlike other dialects, it distinguishes gender. Also, there are many remarkable differences in the dialect in place of the sukun system as well as the vowel or diacritical system following a distinctive set of rules. The Mulaku dialect also has nasal vowels, which are unique only to this dialect.
Huvadhu dialect, spoken by the inhabitants of the large atoll of Huvadhu, is another distinctive form of Maldivian. Because of the isolation from the Northern Atolls, and the capital of Malé, Huvadhu dialect makes more use of the retroflex /ʈ/ than other variants. Huvadhu dialect also retains old Sinhalese words and is sometimes considered to be linguistically closer to Sinhalese than the other dialects of Maldivian. The Huvadhu dialect can be separated into two subdialects, the eastern and western Huvadhu dialects.
Addu dialect is also quite different from the official form of Maldivian and has some affinities with Mulaku dialect. In the past, Addu Atoll being a centre of education, the islanders from the three atolls of the south who acquired education there used Addu dialect as their lingua franca. Hence, when for example one of these islanders of any of the Huvadhu islands met with someone from Fuvahmulah, they would use Addu dialect to talk to each other. Addu dialect is the most widespread of the dialects of Maldivian. However, the secessionist government of the Suvadives (1959–1963) used Malé dialect in its official correspondence.
Madifushi dialect is the lesser known dialect in the Madifushi island of Kolhumadulu and has some similarities with Huvadhu dialect. Word-final 'a' is often replaced with 'e' or 'o', and some final consonants also differ.

The letter Ṇaviyani (ޱ), which represented the retroflex n sound common to many Indic languages (Gujarati, Hindi, etc.), was abolished from official documents in by Muhammad Amin in 1950. Ṇaviyani's former position in the Thaana alphabet, between the letters Gaafu and Seenu, is today occupied by the palatal nasal Ñaviyani (ޏ). It is also used by people of southern atolls when writing songs or poetry in their language variant.

According to Sonja Fritz, "the dialects of Maldivian represent different diachronial stages in the development of the language. Especially in the field of morphology, the amount of archaic features steadily increase from the north to the south. Within the three southernmost atolls (of the Maldives), the dialect of the Addu islands which form the southern tip of the whole archipelago is characterized by the highest degree of archaicity".

However, the Huvadhu Atoll dialect is characterized by the highest degree of archaicity. From Huvadhu Atoll the archaic features decrease toward the south and north.

Fritz also adds that "the different classes of verb conjugation and nominal inflection are best preserved there, morphological simplifications and, as a consequence increasing from atoll to atoll towards north (in the Maldives)".

Spoken and literary varieties 
Maldivian presents another aspect with which English speakers are not too familiar: diglossia, the distinction between what is spoken and what is written. Every language that has a written form has this distinction to a greater or lesser degree, but many Asian languages, including Maldivian exhibit major differences between the two varieties of language. Malé dialect and Maliku dialect are the only dialects commonly used in writing.

Spoken Maldivian, for instance, has twenty-seven consonants. In contrast, written or literary Maldivian includes some Arabic sounds as well. Though these sounds are also used in speaking, their phonetics are not strictly observed. This results in pronunciation as close as possible to spoken Maldivian.

In using  a strict word order also has to be maintained, but in spoken Maldivian word order is not considered to be very rigid.

Writing system 

The Maldivian language has had its own script since very ancient times, most likely over two millennia, when Maldivian Buddhist monks translated and copied the Buddhist scriptures.
It used to be written in the earlier form (Evēla) of the Dhives Akuru ("Dhivehi/Maldivian letters") which are written from left to right. Dhives Akuru were used in all of the islands between the conversion to Islam and until the 18th century. These ancient Maldivian letters were also used in official correspondence with Addu Atoll until the early 20th century. Perhaps they were used in some isolated islands and rural communities until the 1960s, but the last remaining native user died in the 1990s. Today Maldivians rarely learn the Dhives Akuru alphabet, for Arabic is favoured as the second script.

Maldivian is now written using a different script, called Taana or Thaana, written from right to left. This script is relatively recent.

The literacy rate of the Maldives is very high (98%) compared to other South Asian countries. Since the 1960s English has become the medium of education in most schools although they still have Maldivian language classes, but Maldivian is still the language used for the overall administration.

Maldivian uses mainly the Thaana script for writing. It is an alphabet, with obligatory vowels derived from the vowel diacritics of the Arabic abjad.  It is a largely phonemic script: With a few minor exceptions, spelling can be predicted from pronunciation, and pronunciation from spelling.

The origins of Thaana are unique among the world's alphabets: The first nine letters (h–v) are derived from the Arabic numerals, whereas the next nine (m–d) were the local Indic numerals. (See Hindu–Arabic numerals.) This means that Thaana is one of the few alphabets not derived graphically from the original Semitic alphabet – unless the Indic numerals were (see Brahmi numerals). The Thaana alphabet (...) does not follow the ancient order of the other Indic scripts (like or Tamil) or the order of the Arabic alphabet.

Thaana, like Arabic, is written right to left. It indicates vowels with diacritic marks derived from Arabic. Each letter must carry either a vowel or a sukun, which indicates "no vowel".

The vowels are written with diacritical signs called . There are five  for short vowels (a, i, u, e, o), with the first three being identical to the Arabic vowel signs ( and ). Long vowels (aa, ee, oo, ey, oa) are denoted by doubled , except oa, which is a modification of the short .

The letter  represents the glottal stop. It has three different purposes:
It can act as a carrier for a vowe
Gemination of nasals, however, is indicated by + preceding the nasal to be geminated.

Maldivian is also written in "Malé Latin" (most commonly used, such as when romanising place names). IAST transliteration is also sometimes used, and also the Devanāgarī script (almost never used in Maldives, but used in Minicoy)

Latin transliteration 

Towards the mid-1970s, during President Ibrahim Nasir's tenure, the Maldivian government introduced telex machines in the local administration. This was viewed as great progress, but the local Thaana script was deemed to be an obstacle because messages on the telex machines could only be written in the Latin script.

Following this, in 1976 the government approved a new official Latin transliteration, Dhivehi Latin, which was quickly implemented by the administration. Booklets were printed and dispatched to all Atoll and Island Offices, as well as schools and merchant liners. This was seen by many as the effective demise of the Thaana script. Clarence Maloney, an American anthropologist who was in the Maldives at the time of the change, lamented the inconsistencies of the "Dhivehi Latin" which ignored all previous linguistic research on the Maldivian language done by H.C.P. Bell and Wilhelm Geiger. He wondered why the modern Standard Indic transliteration had not been considered. Standard Indic is a consistent script system that is well adapted to writing almost all languages of South Asia. However, this scheme lacks a few sounds used in Maldivian. ISO 15919 has been used by Xavier Romero-Frias to romanize Maldivian in his book The Maldive Islanders - A Study of the Popular Culture of an Ancient Ocean Kingdom.

The government reinstated the Thaana script shortly after President Maumoon took power in 1978. There was widespread relief in certain places, especially rural areas, where the introduction of Latin had been regarded with suspicion. However, the Latin transcription of 1976 continues to be widely used.

Dictionary 
The 412-page hard-back English–Maldivian dictionary, A Maldivian Dictionary, written by Christopher Hanby Baillie Reynolds, was published on 22 July 2003 by Routledge and contains about 5000 individual entries.

Phonology 

The sound system of Maldivian is similar to that of Dravidian languages. Like other modern Indo-Aryan languages the Maldivian phonemic inventory shows an opposition of long and short vowels, of dental and retroflex consonants, and of single and geminate consonants.

  is the vowel sign  denoting "a".
  is the vowel sign denoting "i".
  is the vowel sign  denoting "u".
  is the signdenoting absence of a vowel.

  has developed as an independent phoneme from the diphthong .
 The short open back vowel is phonetically central .

Grammar

Morphology

Nouns

Nouns in Maldivian inflect for definiteness, number and case. Definiteness may be one of definite, indefinite or unspecified. Number may be singular or plural. Case may be one of nominative, dative, ablative, genitive, locative, instrumental or emphatic.

Nominal morphology 
The nominal system of Maldivian comprises nouns, pronouns, adjectives and numerals as parts of speech.

Numerals 
Maldivian uses two numeral systems. Both of them are identical up to 30. After 30, however, one system places the unit numeral stem before the decade, for example,  '31' ( "one and thirty") while the other combines the stem of the decade with the unit numeral, for example,  '31' ("thirty + one"). The latter system also has numerals multiplied by ten for decades 70, 80 and 90. The decade  '60' ("five twelves"), comes from a much older duodecimal, or dozen-based, system which has nearly disappeared.

Verbal morphology 
The Maldivian verbal system is characterised by a derivational relationship between active, causative and involitive/intransitive verb forms.

Word order

The word order in Maldivian is not as rigid as in English, though changes in the order of words in a sentence may convey subtle differences in meaning. To ask for some fish in a market, one uses the following words:  (to me)  (fish)  (sell), which may be put in any of the following orders without a change in meaning:

 .
to me     fish   sell
 .
fish   to me     sell
 .
fish   sell     to me

The word  (to me) may be dropped wherever the context makes it obvious.

Loanwords
Speakers of Maldivian use a great many loanwords from many languages in their everyday conversation (see § Vocabulary). The extent to which loan words are used varies between speakers, depending on their contacts with that language. Thus, those who have had an English education will tend to use a larger number of English words, while an average speaker with little or no contact with English will tend to use just a few. Some of these adopted words have now become so much part of the Maldivian language that there seem to be no other words that could replace them.

There are different ways by which loanwords are naturalised in Maldivian. This depends on whether the loanword refers to a person, a thing, or some kind of action.

Words referring to persons
If the loanword refers to a person, the following suffixes can be used: 
 : indefinite 
 : plural

 waiter + eh = a waiter	
 waiter + un = waiters 	()

Among some of the most common words of this kind are the following:

actor, 
agent, 
ambassador, 
architect, 
bodyguard,
cashier,
director, 
doctor, 
driver, 
guard, 
inspector, 
manager, 
minister, 
operator, 
producer, 
sergeant,
servant

Words referring to things

If the loanword refers to a thing, the suffixes are
 : indefinite singular
  : plural

 car +  = a car 	()
 car +  = cars 	()

Some of the most commonly used words of this kind are the following:

bicycle, 
bill, 
cable, 
cake, 
coat, 
counter, 
parcel, 
ticket

Words referring to actions

For example, using  "cancel":

  +  = cancel (as an order)
  +  = canceling
  +  = has been cancelled/cancelled
  +  = cancelled
  +  = will cancel
  +  = canceling (on its own) i.e. getting cancelled
  +  = cancelled (on its own) i.e. got cancelled
  +  = will cancel (on its own) i.e. will get cancelled

Some examples:

 book  = booking

Levels of speech
People use the second level  and third level  in everyday life.

Vocabulary 

Maldivian contains many loanwords from other languages.

Word origins 
After the arrival of Islam in South Asia, Persian and Arabic made a significant impact on Maldivian. It borrowed extensively from both languages, especially terms related to Islam and the judiciary. Some examples follow:
  – "prayer" (from Persian )
  – "fasting" (from Persian )
  – "table" (from Persian )
  – "non-believer" (from Arabic kāfir)
  – "date" or "history" (from Arabic )
  – "giraffe" (from Arabic )

French origin:

  – "tickle-tickle" (from French guili-guili)

Portuguese influence in the language can be seen from the period of Portuguese colonial power in the region:
  – "hunting spear" (from Portuguese )

Maldivian has also borrowed words from Urdu, Hindi and more recently, English (in particular many scientific and technological terms).

Some common phrases

Sample

The following is a sample text in Maldivian, Article 1 of the Universal Declaration of Human Rights (by the United Nations):

Romanization (ISO 15919):
 

Gloss (word-for-word):
Article 1 – All human-beings also are born, ranking and rights' in freedom and equality acquired people like. Them to good thinking and good brain's endowment acquired is. And they one another to communicate do should brotherhood's spirit with.

Translation (grammatical):
Article 1 – All human beings are born free and equal in ranking and rights. They are endowed with reason and conscience and should act towards one another in a spirit of brotherhood.

Information technology

Typography
Founded in 1984, the Mahal Unit Press at Minicoy prints texts in Maldivian, among other languages. The press also publishes the Lakshadweep Times in three languages on a regular basis: Maldivian, English and Malayalam. This unit is based in the main building, constructed in 1998. For the first time in the history of Lakshadweep, Maldivian was brought into the field of typography.

Activities:
 Production of note books for the department of Education and Jawahar Navodaya School at Minicoy.
 Printing Maldivian textbooks for Standards I to IV.
 Undertaking printing work from the public on a payment basis.

Fonts
Freely downloadable open-source Unicode typefaces featuring Thaana letters include FreeSerif and MPH 2B Damase.

Text editors
A variety of word processors are used to write Maldivian. Among them, the most popular is Microsoft Word.

See also
 Maldives Sign Language

References

Bibliography 
 .
 .
 .

Further reading
 .
 .
 .
 .
 .
 .
 .
 .
 .
 .

External links

 English–Dhivehi Dictionary (archived)
 Dhivehi Academy
 Mahal Unit Press Minicoy (archived)
 Unicode standard for Middle Eastern scripts

 
Southern Indo-Aryan languages
Languages of the Maldives
Languages of India
Dhivehi